Soğukpınar is a quarter of the city Düzce, Düzce District, Düzce Province, Turkey. Its population is 841 (2022).

References

Düzce